Protein FAM107A is a protein that in humans is encoded by the FAM107A gene.

References

Further reading